Khakineh-ye Bala (also Romanized as Khākīneh-ye Bālā; also known as Khākīneh, Khāgīnah, Khaginakh, Khāgīneh, and Khākīneh-ye ‘Olyā) is a village in Niyarak Rural District, Tarom Sofla District, Qazvin County, Qazvin Province, Iran. At the 2006 census, its population was 166, in 37 families.

References 

Populated places in Qazvin County